Gutierrezia petradoria is a species of flowering plant in the family Asteraceae known by the common names San Pedro snakeweed and goldenrod snakeweed

Distribution
The plant is endemic to western Utah, located the Southwestern United States. It is native to the Lower Sevier River watershed, within Juab County and Millard County.

Description

At the end of each branch there is an inflorescence of one or a few flower heads. The heads are larger than for most of the species in the genus. The head contains 5-13 disc florets with 4-10 yellow ray florets around the edge.

References

External links
 USDA Plants Profile for Gutierrezia petradoria (San Pedro snakeweed)
Photo of herbarium specimen collected in Utah in 1980 — isotype of Gutierrezia petradoria.

petradoria
Flora of Utah
Endemic flora of the United States
Juab County, Utah
Millard County, Utah
Plants described in 1981
Flora without expected TNC conservation status